Events in the year 1956 in Germany.

Incumbents
President –  Theodor Heuss
Chancellor –  Konrad Adenauer

Events 
 May 1 - Germany in the Eurovision Song Contest 1956
 June 22 - July 3 - 6th Berlin International Film Festival
 October 27 - Saar Treaty

Births 
5 January - Frank-Walter Steinmeier, politician
7 January
 Leonard Lansink, actor
 Uwe Ochsenknecht, actor
21 January - Jürgen Kehrer, author
16 February - Bodo Ramelow, politician
25 February - Michel Friedman, lawyer, politician and talk show host
27 February - Rosemarie Gabriel, swimmer
28 March - Evelin Jahl, discus thrower
20 March - Theo Breuer, poet, essayist, editor, translator and publisher
12 April - Herbert Grönemeyer, singer
4 May - Ulrike Meyfarth, high jumper
18 May - Lothar Thoms, German track cyclist (died 2017)
31 May - Fritz Hilpert, German musician
1 June – Petra Morsbach, German author
3 June - Thomas Flach, German sailor
6 June - Hans-Peter Ferner, German athlete
8 June - Udo Bullmann, German politician
4 July - Bettina Böttinger, television presenter
13 July - Günter Jauch, television presenter and journalist
24 July
 Carmen Nebel, television presenter
 Hubertus Meyer-Burckhardt, journalist
 1 August - Axel Milberg, actor
 12 August - Brigitte Kraus, athlete
 18 August - Rainer Woelki, bishop of Roman Catholic Church
24 August - Nina Ruge, journalist and television presenter
21 September - Joachim Herrmann, politician
24 September - Ilona Slupianek, shot putter
26 September - Jutta Allmendinger, social scientist
30 September - Désirée Nick, actress and comedian
3 October - Ralph Morgenstern, actor
6 October - Rüdiger Helm, canoeist
20 November - Olli Dittrich, actor and comedian
23 November - Karin Guthke, Olympic diver
28 November - Michael Eissenhauer, art historian
30 November - Heinz Rudolf Kunze, singer
5 December - Klaus Allofs, football player
9 December - Henriette Reker, politician

Deaths

 1 January — Ludwig Dürr, German airship designer (born 1878)
 3 January — Joseph Wirth, German politician, Chancellor of Germany (born 1879)
 13 January — Lyonel Feininger, German painter (born 1871)
 7 February - Karl Schelenz, German sport teacher (born 1890)
 20 February — Heinrich Barkhausen, German physicist (born 1881)
 26 February — Rudolf Kanzler, surveyor and politician (born 1873)
 21 March - Hans Müller-Schlösser, German playwright (born 1884)
 13 April — Emil Nolde, German painter (born 1867)
 16 April — Richard Kolkwitz, German botanist (born 1873)
 29 April - Wilhelm Ritter von Leeb, German field marshal (born 1876)
 10 May - F.W. Schröder-Schrom, German actor (born 1879)
 22 May - Walther Kossel, German physicist (born 1888)
 29 May — Hermann Abendroth, German conductor (born 1883)
 8 June - Hans Meiser, German Protestant theologian, pastor and first 'Landesbischof' of the Evangelical Lutheran Church in Bavaria (born 1881)
 7 July — Gottfried Benn, German poet and essayist (born 1886)
 14 August:
 Bertolt Brecht, German writer (born 1898)
 Konstantin von Neurath, German diplomat and Nazi party chancellor (born 1873)
 21 August - Wilhelm Weskamm, German bishop of Roman Catholic Church (born 1891)
 12 September - Hans Carossa, German novelist (born 1878)
 13 October - Robert Lehr, German politician (born 1883)
 2 November - Leo Baeck, German rabbi (born 1873)
 13 November - Werner Haas, German motorcycle racer (born 1927)
 15 November – Emma Richter, German paleontologist (born 1888)
 25 December — Robert Walser, German writer (born 1878)

See also
1956 in German television

References

 
1950s in Germany
Years of the 20th century in Germany
Germany
Germany